Ambigol was a 19th-century settlement on the Nile River in Sudan. Prior to the construction of the Aswan High Dam and Lake Nubia, it was the site of a minor cataract between the Second and Third major ones. It was part of the Hawawir lands.

References

Populated places in Northern (state)

Ghost towns in Africa